Rokautskyia whitmanii is a species of flowering plant in the family Bromeliaceae, endemic to Brazil (the state of Espírito Santo). It was first described by Elton Leme in 1994 as Cryptanthus whitmanii.

References

whitmanii
Flora of Brazil
Plants described in 1994